The Premier Limited Overs Tournament (currently known as AIA Premier Limited Overs Tournament for sponsorship reasons) is the main domestic limited overs cricket competition in Sri Lanka.  It was established in 1988 and has existed under four different names. The 2016–17 tournament was cancelled due to a legal challenge from Negombo Cricket Club, after they were removed from Tier B of the 2016–17 Premier League Tournament. It was replaced with the 2016–17 Districts One Day Tournament.

List of winners

References

External sources
 CricketArchive – Tournaments in Sri Lanka
 Premier Limited Over Tournament 2013/14 Sri Lanka

Sri Lankan domestic cricket competitions
List A cricket competitions